In mathematical physics, the Belinfante–Rosenfeld tensor is a modification of the energy–momentum tensor that is constructed from the canonical energy–momentum tensor and the spin current so as to be  symmetric yet still conserved.

In a classical or quantum local field theory, the generator of Lorentz transformations  can be written as an integral

 

of a local current

 

Local conservation of angular momentum

 

requires that

 

Thus a source of spin-current implies a non-symmetric canonical energy–momentum tensor.

The Belinfante–Rosenfeld tensor is a modification of the energy momentum tensor

 

that is constructed from the canonical energy momentum tensor and the spin current  so as to be  symmetric yet still conserved.
  
An integration by parts shows that

 

and so a physical interpretation of Belinfante tensor is that it includes the "bound momentum" associated with gradients of the intrinsic angular momentum. In other words, the added term is an analogue of the  "bound current" associated with a magnetization density .

The curious combination of spin-current components required to make  symmetric and yet still conserved seems totally ad hoc, but it was shown by both Rosenfeld and Belinfante that the modified tensor is precisely the symmetric Hilbert energy–momentum tensor that acts as the source of gravity in  general relativity.  Just as it is the sum of the   bound and free currents that acts as a source of the magnetic field, it is the sum of the bound and free energy–momentum that acts as a source of gravity.

Belinfante–Rosenfeld and the Hilbert energy–momentum tensor

The Hilbert energy–momentum tensor  is defined by the variation of the action functional  with respect to the metric as

or equivalently as

(The minus sign in the second equation arises because  because )

We may also define an energy–momentum tensor  by varying a Minkowski-orthonormal vierbein  to get

and so

should be zero.
As   is an arbitrary position-dependent skew symmetric matrix, we see that local Lorentz and rotation invariance both requires and implies that .

Once we know that  is symmetric, it is easy to show that , and so the vierbein-variation energy–momentum tensor is equivalent to the metric-variation Hilbert tensor.

We can now understand  the origin of the Belinfante–Rosenfeld modification of the Noether canonical energy momentum tensor. 
Take the  action to be   where    is the spin connection that is   determined by  via the condition of being metric compatible and torsion free.  The spin current   is then   defined by the variation

The "canonical" Noether energy momentum tensor   is the part that arises from the variation where we keep the spin connection fixed:

Then

Now, for a torsion-free and metric-compatible connection, we have
that

where we are using the notation

Using the spin-connection variation, and after an integration by parts, we find

Thus we see that  corrections to the canonical Noether tensor that appear in the  Belinfante–Rosenfeld tensor occur because we need to simultaneously vary the vierbein and the spin connection if we are to preserve local Lorentz invariance.

As an example,  consider the  classical Lagrangian for the Dirac field

Here the spinor covariant derivatives are

We therefore get

There is no contribution from  if we use the equations of motion, i.e. we are on shell.

Now  

if  are distinct 
and zero otherwise.
As a consequence    is totally antisymmetric. Now,  using this result, and again  the equations of motion, we find that

Thus  the Belinfante–Rosenfeld  tensor becomes

The  Belinfante–Rosenfeld  tensor for the Dirac field is  therefore seen to be  the symmetrized canonical energy–momentum tensor.

Weinberg's definition

Steven Weinberg defined the Belinfante tensor as

where  is the Lagrangian density, the set {Ψ} are the fields appearing in the Lagrangian, the non-Belinfante energy momentum tensor is defined by

.

References

Tensors in general relativity